Silver Cross may refer to:

 SA Police Silver Cross for Gallantry, a civil decoration of South Africa
 Silver Cross (Canada), a Canadian medal
 Silver Cross Field, a baseball field
Silver Cross (Philippines), a military decoration in the Philippines
 Silver Cross of Rhodesia, Rhodesia's second-highest military decoration for conspicuous gallantry
 Silver Cross (company), a British manufacturer of baby transport
 Silver Cross Tavern, a pub in London, England
 Silver Cross,  Zilveren Kruis a Dutch health insurance company
"Silver Cross", a song by Charli XCX from Charli

See also

 Black cross (disambiguation)
 Blue Cross (disambiguation)
 Bronze Cross (disambiguation)
 Gold Cross (disambiguation)
 Green Cross (disambiguation)
 Red Cross (disambiguation)
 White Cross (disambiguation)
 Yellow cross (disambiguation)